Emily Sarah Bourke is an Australian politician. She has been a Labor member of the South Australian Legislative Council since the 2018 state election.

Bourke previously worked as a staffer for Premier Jay Weatherill. She was elevated to the top position on Labor's Legislative Council ticket by the Right faction after Leesa Vlahos withdrew.

After Labor won government at the 2022 state election, Bourke was appointed by new Premier Peter Malinauskas to Cabinet as Assistant Minister to the Premier. In August 2022, she was appointed the assistant minister for autism.

Early and personal life
Bourke was born and grew up on a farm near Maitland on Yorke Peninsula. She studied in Adelaide then moved back to Yorke Peninsula to work for the Yorke Peninsula Country Times. She married Aemon Bourke and they live in Adelaide with three daughters.

References

Year of birth missing (living people)
Living people
Members of the South Australian Legislative Council
Australian Labor Party members of the Parliament of South Australia
Women members of the South Australian Legislative Council
21st-century Australian politicians
21st-century Australian women politicians